Inchture is a village in Scotland between Dundee and Perth on the northern side of the Firth of Tay. It is approximately nine miles (14 km) from Dundee city centre and 13 miles (21 km) from Perth. The village is bypassed by on the A90 trunk road and benefits from a flyover (grade-separated) junction onto the road making it popular with commuters working in Dundee and further afield.

Inchture is a prosperous village with a wide range of housing. The village comprises a post office, flower shop, a SPAR store, hotel, a primary school, community centre and a church. There are approximately 100 original houses in the village and additional homes have been constructed by Muir Homes, Barratt Homes and Scotia Homes. The population is approximately 1500, with an active Community Council and much community engagement including an annual Village Fete.

Inchture is situated within the Carse of Gowrie.

Inchture is twinned with the village of Fléac near Angoulême in France.

At the north end of the village is a lodge and avenue that formerly led to the mansion of Rossie Priory, now cut off by the modern A90.  This avenue is lined on both sides by giant redwood trees (Sequoiadendron giganteum). These were planted in 1853, and are the first known examples of the species successfully cultivated outside North America.

An Episcopal Church, All Souls, was opened in 1896, the foundation stone having been laid  four years earlier. Before this, the local Episcopalians had worshiped at a chapel on the Rossie Estate and later at a mission in Invergowrie.

Near Inchture is Ballindean House, significant for its association with John Wedderburn of Ballendean (NB spelling) and his slave Joseph Knight and thus with the cause of abolitionism in the United Kingdom.

Transport

Inchture Express
The Inchture Express was a horse-drawn carriage service operated by the Caledonian Railway Company. Its rails "ran along a hedge-lined route" to Inchture railway station. It later closed and the rails were lifted.

Notable people
Andrew Heiton (1823–1894), architect

See also
 Abernyte

References

External links

Villages in Perth and Kinross